Pyramidula przevalskii is a species of air-breathing land snail, a terrestrial pulmonate gastropod mollusk in the family Pyramidulidae.

Shell description 
The diameter of the shell is up to 3.25 mm, the height is up to 3.0 mm at 4.5 whorls.

Distribution 
This species is known only from one location in Keriya (Hotan, China). The type series was collected by Nikolay Przhevalsky in 1885. There are currently (2012) no other findings.

References

Pyramidulidae
Taxa named by Wassili Adolfovitch Lindholm
Gastropods described in 1922